Emmanuel Pinda (born 7 January 1961 in Paris) is a French karateka. Pinda won multiple medals at the European Karate Championships and the World Karate Championships.

Medals received
 1988 World Karate Championships men's kumite+80 kg gold medal
 1984 World Karate Championships of men's kumite Ippon gold medal
 1988 European Karate Championships  men's kumite+80 kg silver medal
 1987 European karate Championships at men's kumite+80 kg gold medal
 1987 European Karate Championships at men's kumite open bronze medal
 1985 European Karate Championships at men's kumite open gold medal
 1984 European Karate Championships at men's kumite open silver medal

References

External links
 Emmanuel Pinda at KarateRec.com
 

1961 births
Living people
French male karateka
Sportspeople from Paris
World Games silver medalists
Competitors at the 1985 World Games
20th-century French people
21st-century French people